Michal Doležal (born 19 August 1977, in Teplice) is a Czech football midfielder formerly playing for FK Teplice in the Czech Republic. Doležal usually plays on the far right side of the field specializing in crosses into the penalty area.

References
 Profile at iDNES.cz
 Guardian Football

1977 births
Living people
Czech footballers
Czech First League players
FK Teplice players
SK Dynamo České Budějovice players
FC Hradec Králové players
SV Germania Schöneiche players
Czech expatriate footballers
Expatriate footballers in Germany
Association football midfielders
FK Ústí nad Labem players
People from Teplice
Sportspeople from the Ústí nad Labem Region